Steven Dunbar Jr. (born December 19, 1995) is a professional gridiron football wide receiver for the Edmonton Elks of the Canadian Football League (CFL). He played college football at Houston.

College career
Dunbar started in 38 games for the Houston Cougars and finished his college career with 180 receptions for 2,430 yards and 11 touchdowns. As a senior in 2017, Dunbar earned All-American Athletic Conference Honorable Mention honors.

Professional career

San Francisco 49ers
After being undrafted, the San Francisco 49ers signed Dunbar on May 1, 2018. On September 1, 2018, Dunbar was cut but re-signed with the 49ers' practice squad the next day. On December 26, 2018, Dunbar was promoted to the active roster. He was waived on April 29, 2019.

Denver Broncos
On July 18, 2019, Dunbar signed with the Denver Broncos. He was waived on August 31, 2019.

Dallas Renegades
In the 2020 XFL Draft, Dunbar was selected in the open phase by the Dallas Renegades. He was placed on injured reserve on December 19, 2019. He was waived from injured reserve on March 23, 2020.

Hamilton Tiger-Cats
Dunbar signed with the Hamilton Tiger-Cats of the Canadian Football League on February 10, 2020. After the CFL canceled the 2020 season due to the COVID-19 pandemic, Dunbar chose to opt-out of his contract with the Tiger-Cats on August 31, 2020. He re-signed with the Tiger-Cats on December 2, 2020. Dunbar played 12 regular-season games for the Ticats in his first season in the CFL, catching 44 passes for 630 yards with four touchdowns. He was re-signed by Hamilton on January 30, 2022.

Edmonton Elks
Dunbar joined the Edmonton Elks as a free agent on February 14, 2023.

References

External links
Hamilton Tiger-Cats bio
San Francisco 49ers bio
Houston Cougars football bio

1995 births
Living people
People from Metairie, Louisiana
Players of American football from Louisiana
American football wide receivers
Houston Cougars football players
San Francisco 49ers players
Dallas Renegades players
Denver Broncos players
Hamilton Tiger-Cats players